The Minnaert function is a photometric function used to interpret astronomical observations and remote sensing data for the Earth. It was named after the astronomer Marcel Minnaert. This function expresses the radiance factor (RADF) as a function the phase angle, the photometric latitude and the photometric longitude.

where  is the Minnaert albedo,  is an empirical parameter,  is the scattered radiance in the direction ,  is the incident radiance, and

The phase angle is the angle between the light source and the observer with the object as the center.

The assumptions made are:
 the surface is illuminated by a distant point source.
 the surface is isotropic and flat.

Minnaert's contribution is the introduction of the parameter , having a value between 0 and 1, originally for a better interpretation of observations of the Moon. In remote sensing the use of this function is referred to as Minnaert topographic correction, a necessity when interpreting images of rough terrain.

References 

Observational astronomy
Photometric systems